Antony and Cleopatra  is a 1974 videotaped television production of William Shakespeare's 1606 play of the same name, produced by ATV (which was distributed internationally by ITC) starring Richard Johnson as Mark Antony, Janet Suzman as Cleopatra, and Patrick Stewart as Enobarbus. It was directed by Jon Scoffield and is an adaptation of Trevor Nunn's Royal Shakespeare Company (RSC) production of the play. It features then-little-known Ben Kingsley and Tim Pigott-Smith in small roles.

As of 2014, this production was the last made-for-TV Shakespeare adaptation to have its American network premiere on U.S. commercial television.

Cast
Richard Johnson    ... 	Mark Antony
Janet Suzman       ... 	Cleopatra
Corin Redgrave  ... 	Octavius (Augustus Caesar)
Patrick Stewart   ... 	Enobarbus
Rosemary McHale    ... 	Charmian
Philip Locke   ... 	Agrippa
Mary Rutherford   ... 	        Octavia
Raymond Westwell  ... 	        Lepidus
Mavis Taylor Blake   ... 	Iras
Darien Angadi     ... 	Alexas
Sidney Livingstone    ... Mardian
Geoffrey Hutchings   ... A Fig Seller
Loftus Burton   ... 	Diomedes
Lennard Pearce   ... 	Cleopatra's Schoolteacher
Joseph Charles    ... 	Cleopatra's Messenger
Tony Osoba   ... 	Cleopatra's Servant
Douglas Anderson   ... 	Cleopatra's Eunuch
Michael Egan  ... 	Cleopatra's Eunuch
Paul Gaymon   ... 	Cleopatra's Eunuch
Wendy Bailey   ... 	Servant
Madelaine Bellamy   ... Servant
Edwina Ford   ... 	Servant
Amanda Knott   ... 	Servant
Joe Rock   ... 	Servant
Gito Santana   ... 	Servant
Nicholas McArdle   ... 	King
Derek Wright   ... 	King
Frederick Radley   ... 	King
Norman Caro   ... 	King
Richard Young   ... 	King
Constantine Gregory   ... Ventidius (as Constantin De Goguel)
W. Morgan Sheppard   ... 	Scarus (as Morgan Sheppard)
Joseph Marcell   ... 	Eros (as Joe Marcell)
Jonathan Holt   ... 	Dercetas
Chris Jenkinson   ... 	Silius (as Christopher Jenkinson)
John Bott  ... 	A Soothsayer
Robert Oates   ... 	1st Watchman
Arthur Whybrow   ... 	2nd Watchman
Michael Radcliffe  ... 	3rd Watchman
Geoffrey Greenhill  ... 	Soldier
William Thomas   ... 	Soldier (as William Huw-Thomas)
David Janes  ... 	Soldier
Jeremy Pearce   ... 	Soldier
Mark Sheridan ... 	Soldier
Derek Godfrey   ... 	Maecenas
Ben Kingsley   ... 	Thidias
Martin Milman   ... 	Dolabella
Tim Pigott-Smith   ... 	Proculeius
Keith Taylor  ... 	A Messenger
Thomas Chesleigh   ... 	Gallus
Desmond Stokes   ... 	Taurus
Alan Foss   ... 	A Senator
John Bardon  ... 	Demetrius
Peter Godfrey   ... 	A Sentry
Malcolm Kaye   ... 	A Guard

Deviations from the play
The major character of Sextus Pompey, who figures significantly in the plot in Act II, was excised from this production.

References

External links
 
 

1974 television plays
Films based on Antony and Cleopatra
ITV television dramas
Television shows based on plays
Filmed stage productions
Ancient Egypt in fiction
Television shows shot at ATV Elstree Studios